William Dodd Hathaway (February 21, 1924June 24, 2013) was an American politician and lawyer from Maine. A member of the Democratic Party, he served as a United States senator for Maine from 1973 to 1979, as the U.S. representative for Maine's 2nd congressional district from 1965 to 1973, and as the commissioner of the Federal Maritime Commission from 1990 to 1999.

Early life
Hathaway was born in Cambridge, Massachusetts. He served in World War II in the United States Army Air Corps, where he was shot down while bombing the Ploiești, Romania oil fields during Operation Tidal Wave and was a prisoner of war for over two months. He was awarded the Air Medal, the Purple Heart, and the Distinguished Flying Cross.

After the war he attended Harvard University, graduating in 1949, and Harvard Law School, graduating in 1953. He then moved to Maine and practiced law in Lewiston.

Political career

He served as Assistant County Attorney for Androscoggin County from 1955 to 1957, and he was a Hearing Examiner for the State Liquor Commission from 1957 to 1961.

A Democrat, in 1964 he was elected to the U.S. House from the 2nd District after incumbent Republican Clifford McIntire ran unsuccessfully for the United States Senate, and he served from 1965 until 1973. This was a time of resurgence for Democrats in Maine, at that time a traditionally Republican state. The same period saw the growth of the political careers of Edmund S. Muskie and Kenneth M. Curtis. 

In 1972 Hathaway ran for the United States Senate and defeated four-term Republican incumbent Margaret Chase Smith in a considerable upset. In 1973, Hathaway was one of the three senators who opposed the nomination of Gerald Ford to be Vice President. (The other two were fellow Democrats Thomas Eagleton of Missouri and Gaylord Nelson of Wisconsin.) One of his Senate aides was future Maine Governor and Senator Angus King. Hathaway was an unsuccessful candidate for reelection in 1978, losing to his successor in the 2nd District, future Secretary of Defense William Cohen, by 22 percentage points.

Later life
Hathaway resided in the Washington, D.C., area after leaving the Senate and worked as a lobbyist and lawyer. In 1990 he was appointed by President George H. W. Bush to the Federal Maritime Commission, and he served as chairman from 1993 to 1996.

Hathaway was known and well-liked by the employees of the U.S Senate, especially the Senate elevator operators. He was a constant source of humor and good will to those that worked on the Capitol elevators. "Going Up" is an unpublished manuscript by Kerry Whitney, US Senate Elevator Operator.

He retired in 1996 and continued to live in the Washington, DC, area.

In June 2002, at the age of 78, Hathaway was awarded the Distinguished Flying Cross for heroism during Operation Tidal Wave.

Hathaway was married to Mary Lee Bird of Horse Shoe, North Carolina, and Akron, Ohio, for over 61 years until her death, in 2007. Hathaway had two children, Susan and Fred.

Hathaway died of pulmonary fibrosis exactly 69 years to the day after he was shot down during World War II.

Notes

External links

|-

1924 births
2013 deaths
American prisoners of war in World War II
Democratic Party United States senators from Maine
Federal Maritime Commission members
Harvard Law School alumni
Maine lawyers
Politicians from Cambridge, Massachusetts
Politicians from Lewiston, Maine
Recipients of the Distinguished Flying Cross (United States)
Shot-down aviators
United States Army Air Forces pilots of World War II
World War II prisoners of war held by Germany
Democratic Party members of the United States House of Representatives from Maine
Lawyers from Cambridge, Massachusetts
20th-century American politicians
Burials at Arlington National Cemetery
George H. W. Bush administration personnel
Clinton administration personnel